Powell Plateau, named for geologist and explorer John Wesley Powell, is a 7,661-foot-elevation plateau-summit located in western  Grand Canyon, about 13 mi northwest of Grand Canyon Village in Coconino County of northern Arizona, USA. Being a large plateau. (~300 acres, 0.47 mi2), the plateau causes a large west-northeast-north excursion of the west-flowing Colorado River, caused by the southwest arm of the plateau. There is a slightly-southeast trending arm, and the main plateau then trends north to higher elevations.

The east side of Powell Plateau is drained by White Creek (Muav Canyon), and is traversed by the North Bass Trail. The high point prominence is at the plateau's north terminus, opposite Swamp Point, (North Rim). The high point at the southeast arm's terminus adjacent Dutton Point is 7,538 ft. The high point of the southwest arm is 6,883 ft.

References

External links

 Bass Trail Head to Powell Plateau
 Powell Plateau from Evans Butte: A photo by Harvey Butchart

Grand Canyon, North Rim
Grand Canyon, North Rim (west)

Grand Canyon
Grand Canyon National Park
Landforms of Coconino County, Arizona

Colorado Plateau